John Blount may refer to:

Politicians
John Blount (died 1417), MP for Dorchester (UK Parliament constituency)
John Blount (died 1425), MP for Worcestershire (UK Parliament constituency)
John Blount (died 1531), MP for Shropshire

Others
John Blount, 3rd Baron Mountjoy (c. 1450 – 1485), English peer and soldier
John Blount, scholar (active 1511  – 1538), Fellow of All Souls College, Oxford
Jeb Blount (born 1954), American football quarterback

See also
John Blunt (disambiguation)
Blount (surname)